Mary Merrall (5 January 1890 – 31 August 1973), born Elsie Lloyd, was an English actress whose career of over 60 years encompassed stage, film and television work.

Stage career
Merrall's stage career started in her teens, making her first stage appearance in 1907, as Queenie Merrall, and for the rest of her life she remained a well-known and respected stage actress. Although she was based in London, she often appeared in other prestigious venues in the UK such as the Birmingham Repertory Theatre and the Theatre Royal, Glasgow. 

Among her most famous stage roles were Lady Macbeth in a controversial but influential 1928 modern-dress production by Barry Jackson which opened in Birmingham before transferring to London's Royal Court Theatre, and Mrs. Danvers in Daphne du Maurier's Rebecca at the Strand Theatre in 1940. Her stage career also took her to the United States, where she appeared in Canaries Sometimes Sing (Frederick Lonsdale) in New York and Chicago in 1930.

Film and television
With the exception of an appearance in a 1932 quota quickie Men of Steel, Merrall did not make the move into films until the 1940s. She was given leading roles in the 1940 Irish-set drama Dr. O'Dowd (now classed as a lost film) and the film adaptation of Walter Greenwood's Love on the Dole the following year. The 1940s then brought a steady stream of good film parts including her best-remembered roles as Mrs. Foley in the 1945 classic Dead of Night and Mrs. Nickleby in the Alberto Cavalcanti-directed 1947 screen version of Nicholas Nickleby. Into the 1950s Merrall also landed a string of diverse roles in films such as Encore (1951), prison drama The Weak and the Wicked (1954), comedy The Belles of St. Trinian's (1954) and harrowing World War II drama The Camp on Blood Island (1958).

As film work began to dry up from the late 1950s, Merrall increasingly found work in television, appearing in several productions for the ITV drama strands Play of the Week and ITV Playhouse as well as guest appearances in popular series such as Sir Francis Drake, Dixon of Dock Green, The Saint, The Avengers, Randall and Hopkirk (Deceased) and the UFO episode "A Question of Priorities".

Private life
Merrall married three times. Her first marriage to John Bouch Hissey in 1909 ended acrimoniously in 1914 amid a great deal of public and media interest, after Hissey brought a highly publicised divorce suit alleging infidelity on Merrall's part, naming several men including famous music hall star Albert Whelan. Merrall's second marriage, to noted Shakespearean actor Ion Swinley, was also dissolved in 1927. Her third marriage, to fellow actor Franklin Dyall, lasted until Dyall's death in 1950.

Merrall died in Brighton on 31 August 1973, aged 83.

Partial filmography

 Fatal Fingers (1916) - Irene Lambton
 The Manxman (1917) - Tom's girl
 Duke's Son (1920) - Billy Honour
 Men of Steel (1932) - Mrs. Harg
 Dr. O'Dowd (1940) - Constantia
 You Will Remember (1941) - London Landlady (uncredited)
 Love on the Dole (1941) - Mrs. Hardcastle
 Squadron Leader X (1943) - Miss Thorndike
 Dead of Night (1945) - Mrs. Foley (segment "Linking Story")
 Pink String and Sealing Wax (1945) - Mrs. Ellen Sutton
 This Man Is Mine (1946) - Mrs. Jarvis
 The Life and Adventures of Nicholas Nickleby (1947) - Mrs. Nickleby
 They Made Me a Fugitive (1947) - Aggie
 The Three Weird Sisters (1948) - Isobel Morgan-Vaughan
 Badger's Green (1949) - Mrs. Wetherby
 For Them That Trespass (1949) - Mrs. Drew
 Trio (1950) - Miss Atkin (uncredited)
 The Late Edwina Black (1951) - Lady Southdale
 Encore (1951) - Flora Penezzi (segment "Gigolo and Gigolette")
 Out of True (1951, Short) - Granny
 Judgment Deferred (1952) - Lady Musterby
 Meet Me Tonight (1952) - Mrs. Rockett (segment "Fumed Oak: An Unpleasant Comedy")
 The Pickwick Papers (1952) - Grandma Wardle
 Three's Company (1953) - Mrs. Bailey (segment "Take a Number' story)
 The Weak and the Wicked (1954) - Mrs. Skinner
 Duel in the Jungle (1954) - Mrs. Henderson
 The Belles of St. Trinian's (1954) - Miss Buckland
 The Green Carnation (1954) - Mrs. Rydon-Smith
 The Last Moment (1954) - Housekeeper (segment: 'The Last Moment')
 Destination Milan (1954)
 It's Great to Be Young (1956) - Miss Wyvern, School Mistress
 Campbell's Kingdom (1957) - Miss Ruth
 Rx Murder (1958) - Miss Bettyhill
 The Camp on Blood Island (1958) - Helen
 Spare the Rod (1961) - Miss Fogg
 Bitter Harvest (1963) - Aunt Louisa
 The Amorous Adventures of Moll Flanders (1965) - A Lady
 Who Killed the Cat? (1966) - Janet Bowering
 Futtocks End (1970) - The Aunt

References

External links

1890 births
1973 deaths
English stage actresses
English film actresses
English silent film actresses
English television actresses
Actresses from Liverpool
20th-century English actresses